Vimala College is a Women's college in Thrissur City  of Kerala state, India. It was established in 1967 after bifurcating St. Mary's College, Thrissur. The college is under the management of the Nirmala Province, Thrissur, of The Congregation of Mother of Carmel in the Syro-Malabar Catholic Church.

The college is under the religious jurisdiction of the Syro-Malabar Catholic Archdiocese of Thrissur and is one of the leading educational institutions related to or run by church organizations. Vimala College was the only women's college in Kerala which offered exclusively graduate and post-graduate programmes. The college was presented the R Shankar Award in 2002 by the Government of Kerala. It has been re-accredited with an A grade at 3.3 CGPA in a four-point scale in 2008 by the National Assessment and Accreditation Council, Bangalore.

Notable alumni
 Bobby Aloysius, Olympian 
 Priya Prakash Varrier : Actress
 Gayatri Asokan: singer
 Anju Bobby George: national athlete
 Gayathri Suresh, Actress

See also
Christ College, Irinjalakuda
St. Joseph's College, Irinjalakuda
St. Thomas College, Thrissur
University of Calicut

References

External links

http://vimalacollege.edu.in/home.html

Catholic universities and colleges in India
Educational institutions established in 1967
Colleges in Thrissur
Women's universities and colleges in Kerala
Arts and Science colleges in Kerala
Colleges affiliated with the University of Calicut